Ali Msarri Rashid Abdullah Al Dhahri is a UAE football (soccer) player who plays as a defender for Al Dhafra S.C.C. in the UAE Pro-League.

He was transferred to Al Wasl FC from Al Ain FC during the Winter 2008 transfer window in a 6-month loan deal.

Notes

1981 births
Living people
Al Ain FC players
Al-Wasl F.C. players
Baniyas Club players
Al Dhafra FC players
Dubai CSC players
Emirati footballers
2007 AFC Asian Cup players
UAE First Division League players
UAE Pro League players
Association football defenders
United Arab Emirates international footballers